Park Čaliuskincaŭ is a Minsk Metro station. Opened on June 30, 1984.

The station entrance is near Park Chalyuskintsaw and close to the Children's Railroad.

Gallery 

Minsk Metro stations
Railway stations opened in 1984